Gonocytisus is a genus of flowering plants in the family Fabaceae. It belongs to the subfamily Faboideae.

References

Genisteae
Fabaceae genera